Daniela Maler Pérez (born 4 September 1986) is a Bolivian former footballer. She has been a member of the Bolivia women's national team.

Club career
Maler has played for Gerimex in Bolivia at the 2011 Copa Libertadores Femenina.

International career
Maler represented Bolivia at the 2004 South American U-19 Women's Championship. At senior level, she played the 2006 South American Women's Football Championship.

References

1986 births
Living people
Bolivian women's footballers
Bolivia women's international footballers
Women's association footballers not categorized by position